Patrick Vignal is a French politician representing La République En Marche!. He was re-elected to the French National Assembly on 18 June 2017, representing the department of Hérault. He was originally elected in 2012 as a member of the Socialist Party.

Political career
In parliament, Vignal serves as member of the Committee on Cultural Affairs and Education. In addition to his committee assignments, he is a member of the French-Cuban Parliamentary Friendship Group.

Other activities
 Fonds pour le développement de la vie associative (FDVA), Member of the Advisory Board

References

Living people
Deputies of the 14th National Assembly of the French Fifth Republic
Deputies of the 15th National Assembly of the French Fifth Republic
La République En Marche! politicians
1958 births
Deputies of the 16th National Assembly of the French Fifth Republic